"Something's Coming" is a song from the 1957 musical West Side Story. It was composed by Leonard Bernstein with lyrics by  Stephen Sondheim and is sung solo by the male lead character and tenor 'Tony'. The part of Tony was played by Larry Kert in the original Broadway production, Richard Beymer (voiced by Jimmy Bryant) in the 1961 film and Ansel Elgort in the 2021 film.

Production
In his work Leonard Bernstein, Humphrey Burton explained: "When it was decided to add Tony’s first-act song “Something’s Coming,” Bernstein and Sondheim raided the scene-setting page in Laurents’s outline. “something’s coming,” Laurents had written: “it may be around the corner, whistling down the river, twitching at the dance – who knows?” The lines were incorporated in the lyrics. “We raped Arthur’s play-writing,” Bernstein said. “I’ve never seen anyone so encouraging, let alone  generous, urging us, ‘Yes, take it, take it, make it a song.’”" 

Bernstein reported on the last minute change thus:

Synopsis
BBC.com explains:

Composition
BBC.com explains "The song opens and closes in D major. It modulates to C major for two contrasting sections of the song...The song opens with a syncopated accompaniment figure in 3/4 time. A similar repeated pattern is heard throughout. The pitches change to fit the harmony. The accompaniment stays in the background throughout so that the singer can be heard clearly. The opening accompaniment is played by clarinets (including bass), pizzicato (plucked) strings, drum kit (snare drum and hi-hat cymbal, played with wire brushes)". The site also noted "the same bar of accompaniment is repeated several times...[as] this gives time for the actors to move across the stage and is a device often used in musicals. It noted that the song alternates between 2/4 and 3/4 time signatures, the word-setting is mostly syllabic (one word to a syllable), and that the song includes many examples of triplets. It also explains "'Something's Coming' does not follow a standard song structure such as verse and chorus. Instead it is held together by three ideas or themes which are heard throughout the song and presented in different ways." The first theme has a "tritone between the bass note C and the F sharp in the vocal line. The F sharp resolves onto a G.", the second has "declamatory repeated notes and the use of accents", and the third has "long sustained notes, legato phrases and rising intervals".

Critical reception
Chichester.col.uk noted the song is meant to "capture...a sense of hope". AllMusic wrote of the Oscar Peterson Trio jazz version of the song "Something's Coming seems like a series of vignettes, constantly shifting its mood, as if moving from one scene to the next. "

Use in Exams  
In 2008, the English exam board Edexcel added 'Something's Coming' to their Music GCSE syllabus, and is now used as one of the 12 set works covered in the course, under '20th Century Music'.

Selected recordings
 Larry Kert - on the Broadway cast album (1957)
 Jimmy Bryant - on the 1961 film soundtrack album (1961)
 Sammy Davis Jr. - on the album Sammy Davis Jr. Belts the Best of Broadway (1962)
 Vic Damone - on the album On the Street Where You Live (1964)
 Johnny Mathis - on the album The Shadow of Your Smile (1966)
 Shirley Bassey - on the album 	12 of Those Songs (1968)
 Yes - non-album single B side for "Sweetness" (1969)
 Todd Rundgren's Utopia - on the album Another Live (1975)
 Barbra Streisand - on the albums The Broadway Album (1985) and One Voice (1987)
 Cécile McLorin Salvant - on the album For One to Love (2015)
 Ansel Elgort - on the 2021 film soundtrack album (2021)

References

External links
 Further analysis of the Something's Coming

Songs from West Side Story
Songs with music by Leonard Bernstein
1957 songs
Yes (band) songs
Songs written by Stephen Sondheim

sv:Something's Comin'